Falls Church is an independent city in the Commonwealth of Virginia. As of the 2020 census, the population was 14,658. Falls Church is included in the Washington metropolitan area.

Taking its name from The Falls Church, an 18th-century Church of England (later Episcopal Church) parish, Falls Church gained township status within Fairfax County in 1875. In 1948, it was incorporated as the City of Falls Church, an independent city with county-level governance status although it is not a county.

The city's corporate boundaries do not include all of the area historically known as Falls Church; these areas include portions of Seven Corners and other portions of the current Falls Church postal districts of Fairfax County, as well as the area of Arlington County known as East Falls Church, which was part of the town of Falls Church from 1875 to 1936. For statistical purposes, the U.S. Department of Commerce's Bureau of Economic Analysis combines the City of Falls Church with Fairfax City and Fairfax County.

At 2.11 square miles, Falls Church is the smallest incorporated municipality in the Commonwealth of Virginia and the smallest county-equivalent municipality in the United States.

Etymology 
The independent city of Falls Church is named for the 1734 Church of England (later Episcopal Church) house of worship named The Falls Church founded at the intersection of important Native American trails that were later paved and named Broad Street, Lee Highway and Little Falls Street.

History

The first known government in the area was the Iroquois Confederacy. After exploration by Captain John Smith, England began sending colonists to what they called Virginia. While no records have yet been found showing the earliest colony settlement in the area, a cottage demolished between 1908 and 1914, two blocks from the city center, bore a stone engraved with the date "1699" set into one of its two large chimneys.

During the American Revolution the area is most known for The Falls Church vestrymen George Washington and George Mason. A copy of the United States Declaration of Independence was read to citizens from the steps of The Falls Church during the summer of 1776.

During the American Civil War Falls Church voted 44–26 in favor of secession. The Confederate Army occupied the then village of Falls Church as well as Munson's and Upton's hills to the East, probably due to their views of Washington, D.C. On September 28, 1861, Confederate troops withdrew from Falls Church and nearby hills, retreating to the heights at Centreville. Union troops took Munson's and Upton's hills, yet the village was never entirely brought under Union rule. Mosby's Raiders made several armed incursions into the heart of Falls Church to kidnap and murder suspected Northern sympathizers in 1864 and 1865.

Historic sites
Cherry Hill Farmhouse and Barn, an 1845 Greek-Revival farmhouse and 1856 barn, owned and managed by the city of Falls Church, are open to the public on select Saturdays in summer. Tinner Hill Arch and Tinner Hill Heritage Foundation represent a locus of early African American history in the area, including the site of the first rural chapter of the NAACP. Two of the District of Columbia's original 1791 boundary stones (see: Boundary Markers of the Original District of Columbia) are located in public parks on the boundary between Falls Church and Arlington County. The West cornerstone stands in Andrew Ellicott Park at 2824 Meridian Street, Falls Church and N. Arizona Street, Arlington, just south of West Street. Stone number SW9 stands in Benjamin Banneker Park on Van Buren Street, south of 18th Street, near the East Falls Church Metro station. Most of Banneker Park is in Arlington County, across Van Buren Street from Isaac Crossman Park at Four Mile Run.

Sites on the National Register of Historic Places

Geography

Falls Church is the smallest independent city by area in Virginia. Since independent cities in Virginia are considered county-equivalents, it is also the smallest county-equivalent in the United States by area.

The center of the city is the crossroads of Virginia State Route 7 (Broad St./Leesburg Pike) and U.S. Route 29 (Washington St./Lee Highway).

Tripps Run, a tributary of the Cameron Run Watershed, drains two-thirds of Falls Church, while the Four Mile Run watershed drains the other third of the city. Four Mile Run flows at the base of Minor's Hill, which overlooks Falls Church on its north, and Upton's Hill, which bounds the area to its east.

Demographics

2020 census

Note: the US Census treats Hispanic/Latino as an ethnic category. This table excludes Latinos from the racial categories and assigns them to a separate category. Hispanics/Latinos can be of any race.

2010 census
As of the census of 2010, Falls Church City had a population of 12,332. The population density was 6,169.1 people per square mile. There were 5,496 housing units. The racial makeup of the city was 80.6% White, 5.3% Black or African American, 0.5% Native American, 9.3% Asian, 0.1% Pacific Islander, and 4.3% from two or more races. Hispanic or Latino of any race were 9.5% of the population.

In the city, the population was spread out, with 7.3% under the age of five, 26.6% under the age of 18, and 11.6% over the age of 65. The percentage of the population that were female was 51%. 74.4% of the population had a bachelor's degree or higher (age 25+).

The median income for a household in the city was $120,000, with 4% of the population below the poverty line, the lowest level of poverty of any independent city or county in the United States.

2000 census
As of the census of 2000, there were 10,377 people, 4,471 households, and 2,620 families residing in the city. The racial makeup of the city was 84.97% White, 3.28% Black or African American, 0.24% Native American, 6.50% Asian, 0.07% Pacific Islander, 2.52% from other races, and 2.43% from two or more races. Hispanic or Latino of any race were 8.44% of the population.

There were 4,471 households, out of which 30.1% had children under the age of 18 living with them; 47.1% were married couples living together, 8.6% had a female householder with no husband present, and 41.4% were non-families. 33.8% of all households were made up of individuals, and 10.1% had someone living alone who was 65 years of age or older. The average household size was 2.31 and the average family size was 3.01.

In the city, the population was spread out, with 23.4% under the age of 18, 5.1% from 18 to 24, 31.1% from 25 to 44, 28.1% from 45 to 64, and 12.2% who were 65 years of age or older. The median age was 40 years. For every 100 females, there were 94.8 males. For every 100 females age 18 and over, there were 89.9 males.

The median income for a household in the city was $74,924, and the median income for a family was $97,225. Males had a median income of $65,227 versus $46,014 for females. The per capita income for the city was $41,051. About 2.8% of families and 4.2% of the population were below the poverty line, including 4.3% of those under age 18 and 4.1% of those age 65 or over.

Economy

In 2011, Falls Church was named the richest county (or county-equivalent) in the United States, with a median annual household income of $113,313. While Fortune 500 companies General Dynamics and Northrop Grumman have headquarters with mailing addresses in Falls Church, they are physically in Fairfax County.

Top employers
According to the city's 2020 Comprehensive Annual Financial Report, the top employers in the City are:

The city has broken ground on several redevelopment projects to be completed in the next few years, including the West Falls Church Economic Development Project and Founders Row along Route 7/Broad street.

Arts and culture

Annual events
The city holds an annual Memorial Day Parade with bands, military units, civic associations, and fire/rescue stations, in recent years the event has featured a street festival with food, crafts, and non-profit organization booths, and a 3K fun run (the 2009 race drew some 3,000 runners). the Falls Church Farmer's Market is held Saturdays year-round, Jan 3 – April 25 (9 am – Noon), May 2 – Dec 26 (8 am – Noon), at the City Hall Parking Lot, 300 Park Ave. In addition to regional attention, in 2010 the market was ranked first in the medium category of the American Farmland Trust's contest to identify America's Favorite Farmers' Markets.

Cultural institutions

The Falls Church Village Preservation and Improvement Society was founded in 1885 by Arthur Douglas and re-established in 1965 to promote the history, culture, and beautification of the city. The Tinner Hill Heritage Foundation was founded in 1997 by Edwin B. Henderson II to preserve the Civil Rights and African American history and culture. Falls Church is where the first rural branch of the NAACP was established stemming from events that took place in 1915, when the town passed a segregation ordinance by creating segregated districts in the town. The ordinance was not enforced after the U. S. Supreme Court ruling in Buchanan v. Warley in 1917. The Mary Riley Styles Public Library is Falls Church's public library; established in 1899, its current building was constructed for the purpose in 1958 and expanded in 1993 and 2021. In addition to its circulating collections, it houses a local history collection, including newspaper files, local government documents, and photographs. The State Theatre stages a wide variety of live performances. Built as a movie house in 1936, it was reputed to be the first air-conditioned theater on the east coast. It closed in 1983; after extensive renovations in the 1990s, including a stage, bar, and restaurant, it re-opened as a music venue.

Government

Falls Church is governed by a seven-member city council, each elected at large for four-year, staggered terms. Council members are typically career professionals holding down full-time jobs. In addition to attending a minimum of 22 council meetings and 22 work sessions each year, they also attend meetings of local boards and commissions and regional organizations (several Council Members serve on committees of regional organizations as well). Members also participate in the Virginia Municipal League and some serve on statewide committees. The mayor is elected by members of the council. The city operates in a typical council–manager form of municipal government, with a city manager hired by the council to serve as the city's chief administrative officer. The city's elected Sheriff is Metin "Matt" Cay. Candidates for city elections typically do not run under a nationally affiliated party nomination.

City services and functions include education, parks and recreation, library, police, land use, zoning, building inspections, street maintenance, and storm water and sanitary sewer service. Often named a Tree City USA, the city has one full-time arborist. Some public services are provided by agreement with the city's county neighbors of Arlington and Fairfax, including certain health and human services (Fairfax); and court services, transport, and fire/rescue services (Arlington). The city provided water utility service to a large portion of eastern Fairfax County, including the dense commercial areas of Tysons Corner and Merrifield, until January 2014, when the water utility was sold to the Fairfax County Water Authority.

Education
The city is served by Falls Church City Public Schools:
 Jessie Thackrey Preschool
 Mount Daniel Elementary School, which includes kindergarten through second grade.
 Oak Street Elementary, which includes grades 3–5.
 Mary Ellen Henderson Middle School, which includes grades 6–8.
 Meridian High School, which includes grades 9–12.

Of these four Falls Church City Public Schools, one, Mount Daniel Elementary School, is located outside city limits in neighboring Fairfax County. Falls Church High School is not part of the Falls Church City Public School system, but rather the Fairfax County Public School system; it does not serve the city of Falls Church.

Falls Church City is eligible to send up to three students per year to the Fairfax County magnet school, Thomas Jefferson High School for Science and Technology.

The city is home to Saint James Catholic School, a parochial school serving grades K–8, and Grace Christian Academy, a Pre-K to 8th grade Christian parochial school of the Wisconsin Evangelical Lutheran Synod.

Media
The Falls Church News-Press is a free weekly newspaper founded in 1991 that focuses on local news and commentary and includes nationally syndicated columns. The area is also served by national and regional newspapers, including The Washington Times and The Washington Post. The City is also served by numerous citizen- and corporate-sponsored Internet blogs. WAMU Radio 88.5 produces news and opinion programs with a local focus.

Infrastructure

Transportation

Although two stations on the Washington Metro's Orange Line have "Falls Church" in their names, neither lies within the City of Falls Church: East Falls Church station is in Arlington County and West Falls Church station is in Fairfax County.
 Metro's Silver Line, completed July 2014, serves the East Falls Church station. It runs between Largo Town Center in the east, following the Blue Line route to Stadium-Armory, the Orange and Blue Lines to Rosslyn, and finally the Orange route alone until it reaches East Falls Church, where it branches off towards the northwest, terminating in Ashburn, servicing Dulles International Airport. East Falls Church is the westernmost designated transfer station.
 The Washington Metropolitan Area Transit Authority provides bus service throughout the Washington metropolitan area, including Falls Church.
 A small portion of the  Washington & Old Dominion Railroad Trail (W&OD Trail) runs through the City (see: Washington & Old Dominion Railroad Regional Park). The trail enters the City from the west between mile markers 7 and 7.5 (near Broad Street). The trail enters the city from the east between mile markers 5.5 and 6. The W&OD Trail travels on the rail bed of the Washington and Old Dominion Railroad and various predecessor lines, which provided passenger service from 1860 to May 31, 1951, with exception of a few years during the U.S. Civil War. Freight service was abandoned when the railroad closed in August 1968. The Four Mile Run Trail, which ends at an intersection with the Mount Vernon Trail near Ronald Reagan Washington National Airport, begins in the city at Van Buren Street. These trails comprise a major bicycle commuting route to Washington, D.C.

Major highways

The primary roads serving Falls Church directly are U.S. Route 29 and Virginia State Route 7. The portion of US 29 through Falls Church is also coincident with Virginia State Route 237. Most of Virginia State Route 338 is also within Falls Church. Interstate 66 passes just north of the city, while Interstate 495 passes a few miles to the west.

Notable people
 Golnar Adili (1976), multidisciplinary artist
 Brian Alvey,  serial entrepreneur
 Tommy Amaker (1965), current men's basketball head coach at Harvard University
 Allan Bridge, conceptual artist
 Jane Brucker, actress and screenwriter
 Caroline Calloway, Instagram personality
 Hal Corley, Emmy-winning TV writer, published playwright 
 Jayme Cramer, backstroke and butterfly swimmer
 Carmen Fernandez, social worker and entrepreneur
 Nick Galifianakis, cartoonist
 Ryan Hall, professional mixed martial artist who won the 22nd season of The Ultimate Fighter, now currently competing in the featherweight division of the UFC.
 John Hartman, musician and founding member of The Doobie Brothers
 Molly Henneberg, news reporter, grew up in Falls Church
 Mike Hindert, bass guitarist
 John Kirby, attorney, credited as namesake for Nintendo's character "Kirby"
 Louisa Krause, actress
 Nancy Kyes, film and television actress
 Taryn Manning, actress
 Matthew F. McHugh, former US congressman
 Kyle E. McSlarrow, former Deputy Secretary of the United States Department of Energy
 Alixa Naff, historian
 Joseph Harvey Riley, ornithologist
 Eric Schmidt (1955), Executive Chairman & former CEO of Google, former CEO of Novell, 96th-richest person in the world as of April 2021
 Mohamed Soltan, political activist
 Fred Talbot (1941–2013), professional baseball player
Tatianna, drag performer and competitor on RuPaul's Drag Race
James Thurber (1902) author and humorist, namesake of James Thurber Ct in Falls Church

In popular culture
The principal characters in the television series The Americans, Philip and Elizabeth Jennings, and their children Paige and Henry, as well as FBI agent Stan Beeman, live in Falls Church. In the TV Series JAG, their headquarters are in Falls Church, Virginia.

Sister city 
In 2006, Falls Church entered into a sister city relationship with Kokolopori, Democratic Republic of the Congo.

References

External links 

 

 
Cities in Virginia
Washington metropolitan area
Little Saigons
Virginia in the American Civil War
Populated places established in 1733
1733 establishments in Virginia
1948 establishments in Virginia